Chararica is a genus of snout moths. It was described by Carl Heinrich in 1956.

Species
Chararica annuliferella (Dyar, 1905)
Chararica bicolorella (Barnes & McDunnough, 1917)
Chararica circiimperfecta Neunzig, 1996
Chararica hystriculella (Hulst, 1889)

References

Phycitinae
Pyralidae genera
Taxa named by Carl Heinrich